The 2014–15 Nebraska Cornhuskers women's basketball team will represent University of Nebraska–Lincoln during the 2014–15 NCAA Division I women's basketball season. The Cornhuskers, led by 13th year head coach Connie Yori, play their home games at the newly Pinnacle Bank Arena and were members of the Big Ten Conference. They finished the season 21–11, 10–8 in Big Ten play to finish in seventh place. They advanced to the quarterfinals of the Big Ten women's tournament where they lost to Iowa. They received at-large bid of the NCAA women's tournament where they lost to Syracuse in the first round.

Previous season
The Nebraska Cornhuskers finished the 2013-14 season with an overall record of 26–7, with a record of 12–4 in the Big Ten regular season for a 3rd-place finish. In the 2014 Big Ten tournament, the Cornhuskers won their first Big Ten Women's Basketball Tournament in school history. They were invited to the 2014 NCAA Division I women's basketball tournament, making their 12th appearance. They lost in the second round to BYU.

Off Season

Departures

2014 Recruiting Class

Roster

Schedule

|-
!colspan=9 style="background: #E11D38; color: #ffffff"| Exhibition

|-
!colspan=9 style="background: #E11D38; color: #ffffff"| Non-conference regular season

|-
!colspan=9 style="background: #E11D38; color: #ffffff"| Big Ten regular season

|-
!colspan=9 style="background: #E11D38; color: #ffffff"| Big Ten women's tournament

|-
!colspan=9 style="background: #E11D38; color: #ffffff"|NCAA women's tournament

Source

Rankings

See also
2014–15 Nebraska Cornhuskers men's basketball team

References

Nebraska Cornhuskers women's basketball seasons
Nebraska
Nebraska
Cornhusk
Cornhusk